R507 road may refer to:
 R507 road (Ireland)
 R507 road (South Africa)